Norbert Pintér (born 3 November 1992 in Senta) is a Hungarian football player who plays for Kaposvári Rákóczi.

Career
Before, he played with TSC Bačka Topola having helped them to reach their historical promotion to the Serbian SuperLiga.

Honours
TSC Bačka Topola
Serbian First League: 2017–18

References

 balmazfoci.hu 
 focikatalogus.hu 
 

1992 births
Living people
People from Senta
Hungarians in Vojvodina
Hungarian footballers
Association football midfielders
Nemzeti Bajnokság II players
Balmazújvárosi FC players
Kaposvári Rákóczi FC players
Serbian First League players
FK TSC Bačka Topola players
Liga II players
FK Csíkszereda Miercurea Ciuc players
Hungarian expatriate footballers
Expatriate footballers in Romania
Hungarian expatriate sportspeople in Romania